Adamo Paolo Cultraro (born June 6, 1973) is an Italian–American filmmaker, director, writer, and producer. He is the founder of Taormina Films, a production company.

Cultraro was born in Toronto, Ontario, Canada, to Italian parents. His first language was Italian and he still speaks it fluently.   Cultraro has directed webisodes, a TV pilot, numerous shorts, and recently the feature film Corrado, starring Tom Sizemore, Johnny Messner, Candace Elaine, Edoardo Ballerini, Tony Curran, Frank Stallone, and Joseph Gannascoli. Cultraro's latest action feature film is Tactical Force, starring Stone Cold Steve Austin, Michael Jai White, Michael Shanks, Lexa Doig, and Keith Jardine, and released by Vivendi Entertainment. Tactical Force debuted at #24 on IMDb's Star Meter and went on to become #10 in the top ten best selling DVDs in the United States for the month of August 2011, making it among the most successful DVD releases of a Stone Cold Steve Austin picture ever produced.

Filmography
 The Ensnaring (Short Film, 2006) 
 Hard Sand (TV Pilot, 2006)
 Credere, Obbedire, Combattere! – known as Believe, Obey, Fight in North America (Documentary Feature, 2007)
 Corrado, feature film
 Tactical Force (2011), feature film

External links
 
 
 
 Adamo's blog at DVXUser.com
  Taormina Films, LLC website

References

1973 births
Living people
American film directors
American people of Italian descent
Film directors from Toronto
Writers from Toronto
Canadian emigrants to the United States